Murree (Punjabi, Urdu: مری) is a mountain resort city, located in the Galyat region of the Pir Panjal Range, within the Murree District of Punjab, Pakistan. The British built this town during their rule to escape the scorching heat in the plains of Punjab during the summer.

Construction of the town was started in 1851 on the hill of Murree as a sanatorium for British troops. The permanent town of Murree was constructed in 1853 and the church was consecrated shortly thereafter. One main road was established, commonly referred to even in modern times, as the mall. Murree was the summer headquarters of the colonial Punjab Government until 1876 when it was moved to Shimla.

Murree became a popular tourist station for British citizens of the British Raj. Several prominent Britons were born here including Bruce Bairnsfather, Francis Younghusband, Reginald Dyer and Joanna Kelley. During the colonial era, access to commercial establishments was restricted for non-Europeans. Such establishments included Lawrence College, Murree.

Since the Independence of Pakistan in 1947, Murree has retained its position as a popular hill station, noted for its pleasant summer weather. Many tourists visit the town from the Islamabad-Rawalpindi area. The town also serves as a transit point for tourists visiting Azad Kashmir and Abbottabad. The town is noted for its Tudorbethan and neo-gothic architecture. The Government of Pakistan owns a summer retreat in Murree, where foreign dignitaries including heads of state often visit.

History

Murree, or Marhee as it was then called, was first identified as a potential hill station by Major James Abbott in 1847.

The town's early development was in 1851 by President of the Punjab Administrative Board, Sir Henry Lawrence. It was originally established as a sanatorium for British troops garrisoned on the Afghan frontier. Officially, the municipality was created in 1850.

The permanent town of Murree was constructed at Sunnybank in 1853. The church was sanctified in May 1857, and the main road, Jinnah Road, originally known as Mall Road and still commonly referred to as "The Mall"), was built. The most significant commercial establishments, the Post Office, general merchants with European goods, tailors and a millinery, were established opposite the church. Until 1947, access to Mall Road was restricted for "natives" (non-Europeans).

In the summer of 1857, a rebellion against the British broke out. The local tribes of Murree and Hazara, including the Dhund Abbasis and others, attacked the depleted British Army garrison in Murree; however, the tribes were ultimately overcome by the British and capitulated. From 1873 to 1875, Murree was the summer headquarters of the Punjab local government; after 1876 the headquarters were moved to Shimla.

The railway connection with Lahore, the capital of the Punjab Province, via Rawalpindi, made Murree a popular resort for Punjab officials, and the villas and other houses erected for the accommodation of English families gave it a European aspect. The houses crowned the summit and sides of an irregular ridge, the neighbouring hills were covered during the summer with encampments of British troops, while the station itself was filled with European visitors from the plains and travellers to Kashmir. It was connected with Rawalpindi by a service tangas.

It was described in the Gazetteer of Rawalpindi District, 1893–94 as follows:

It is the most accessible hill station in the Punjab, being distant from Rawalpindi only a five hours' journey by tonga dak. Magnificent views are to be obtained in the spring and autumn of the snow crowned mountains of Kashmir; and gorgeous sunset and cloud effects seen daily during the rains [July–August]. Part of the station, especially the Kashmir end, are also well wooded and pretty.

In 1901, the permanent population of the town was 1,844; if summer visitors had been included this could have been as high as 10,000.

In early January 2022, over 20 people died trying to reach the town during a snowstorm.

Climate

Murree features a monsoon influenced subtropical highland climate (Cwb) under the Köppen climate classification. It is situated in the outer Himalayas, retaining high altitude. This type of area has cold, snowy winters, relatively cool summers with drastically escalated rain, in relation with lower altitudes, and frequent fog. Precipitation is received year round, with two maxima, first one during winter and second one at summer, July–August. Heavy snowfall starts in January and February.

Administration

Murree is the municipal capital of Murree Tehsil, an administrative division of the Rawalpindi District. As well as being tehsil headquarters, Murree is also a Union Council, bounded to the north by Darya Gali and Rawat, to the west by Ghora Gali and Tret, to the south by Numbal and Mussiari, and to the east by Ghel and Angoori.

Localities and Union Councils of the Murree area:

Rawalpindi District
Kohati KakRahi
Bhurban
Dewal Sharif
Darya Gali
Gulehra Gali
Uc Ghel
Bochal Kakrahi
Ghora Gali
Bansara Gali
Jhika Gali
Mohra Sharif
Potha Sharif
Aliot, Murree
Sehr Bagla
Patriata
Karore
Phagwari
Las Kothar
Numbal
Mussiyari

Military
For administrative purposes, the military areas of Murree are divided into two separate cantonments, Murree Gali Cantonment and Murree Hills Cantonment. Murree houses the headquarters of the 12th Infantry Division of the Pakistan Army, several educational and training institutions, and a combined military hospital established to serve Murree and adjoining garrisons.

The Pakistan Air Force also maintains a base at Lower Topa, near Patriata, with its own military boarding school for boys, PAF Public School Lower Topa.

During the British Raj, in the hot season Murree was the headquarters of the Lieutenant General of the Northern Command. The Commissioner of the Rawalpindi Division and the Deputy-Commissioner of Rawalpindi also resided here during part of the season, for which period an Assistant Commissioner was placed in charge of the subdivision consisting of Murree Tehsil. The site was selected in 1850 almost immediately after the annexation of the Province, and building operations commenced at once. In 1851 temporary accommodation was provided for a detachment of troops; and in 1853 permanent barracks were erected. The regular garrison generally consisted of two mountain batteries and one battalion of infantry.

Notable residents

Current

Ansar Abbasi, journalist and socially conservative commentator
Kashif Abbasi, journalist, television talk show host and anchorperson
Muhammad Nawaz Abbasi, former justice of the Supreme Court of Pakistan and a former justice of Lahore High Court
Sadaqat Ali Abbasi, politician & sitting Member of the National Assembly
Sadia Abbasi, politician
Shahid Khakan Abbasi, former Prime Minister of Pakistan
Zafar Mahmood Abbasi, Chief of Naval Staff (CNS) of the Pakistan Navy
Marriyum Aurangzeb, politician
Javed Malik, former Ambassador at Large of Pakistan & Special Advisor to the Prime Minister on foreign investments
Parikshit Sahni, Indian actor
Mohammad Wasim, cricketer

Deceased

Reginald Dyer (1864–1927), British Army officer
Gerald Lathbury (1906–1978), British Army officer
Muhammad Riaz Khan Abbasi (d. 1979), Director-General of the Inter-Services Intelligence (ISI)
Khaqan Abbasi (d. 1988), politician
Harold Hall (1913–2004), cricketer and British civil servant
Muztar Abbasi (1931–2004), scholar
Raja Ashfaq Sarwar (1954–2020), politician

Sister Cities

Shimla, Himachal Pradesh

Notes

Citations

References
 
 
 
Attribution:

Further reading

 
 
 
 

 
Cantonments of Pakistan
Galyat of Pakistan
Populated places in Murree District
Populated places in Murree Tehsil
Hill stations in Pakistan
Resorts in Pakistan
Tourism in Murree
Tourist attractions in Punjab, Pakistan
Populated places established in 1851
1851 establishments in British India
Murree District